Eduardo Adrián Ávila Sánchez (born 20 December 1986) is a Mexican Paralympic judoka who competes in international level events. He is two-time Paralympic champion, two-time World champion and a four-time Parapan American Games champion in the middleweight category.

Ávila Sánchez began playing judo when he was eight years old when he watched judo competitions with his father who also encouraged him to take part in the sport. When Ávila Sánchez was 21, he competed in national competitions when he decided to devote his life to judo.

References

1986 births
Living people
Sportspeople from Mexico City
Paralympic judoka of Mexico
Judoka at the 2008 Summer Paralympics
Judoka at the 2012 Summer Paralympics
Judoka at the 2016 Summer Paralympics
Medalists at the 2008 Summer Paralympics
Medalists at the 2012 Summer Paralympics
Medalists at the 2016 Summer Paralympics
Medalists at the 2007 Parapan American Games
Medalists at the 2011 Parapan American Games
Medalists at the 2015 Parapan American Games
Medalists at the 2019 Parapan American Games
Medalists at the 2020 Summer Paralympics
20th-century Mexican people
21st-century Mexican people